Southlake Mall is a shopping mall located in Morrow, Georgia, United States. The mall is in Clayton County and its trade area includes Henry County, one of the fastest-growing areas in Georgia. The mall is located along Interstate 75 and State Highway 54, also known as Jonesboro Road.

History
Southlake Mall opened in 1976 to serve the needs of the growing southside of Atlanta. When Southlake opened, its anchors were Rich's, Davison's, Sears, and JCPenney. Rich's eleventh suburban store debuted at the mall in August 1976. The two-story, 230,000-square-foot store also had a restaurant and snack bar.

The first major change was in 1986 - when the Davison's nameplate was changed to its parent company, Macy's. This lasted until 2003 - when Macy's closed all the older Davison's stores in Atlanta and consolidated to Rich's-Macy's. The standalone Macy's location closed in January 2003. The Rich's-Macy's store, once a standalone Rich's, lasted until 2005 - when it became a standalone Macy's.

The only major renovation to the center was in 1999. The updates included a relocation of the food court to the lower level and the addition of a carousel. The escalators were moved to either end of the mall rather than only one near the center. The fountain was removed from the downstairs area in front of Sears and Radio Shack to accommodate one of the escalators.

In January 2011, it was announced that JCPenney would close its store on June 1 of that year.

On February 5, 2013, the mall fell into foreclosure - after several years of decline. Anchor spaces were not included in the foreclosure.

General Growth Properties, then the mall's owner, which had just emerged itself in 2010 from bankruptcy, released its interests in the mall - citing its new focus to concentrate on stronger performing properties. The mall's mortgage was supervised for a short time in 2012 by C-III Asset Management before being sold to B Properties - a subsidiary of Bayer Properties that specializes in rehabilitating struggling malls.

On May 31, 2018, Sears announced that it would be closing its location at Southlake Mall in September 2018 as part of a plan to close 72 stores nationwide - leaving Macy's as the only anchor left.

The mall was sold to a joint venture between two New York real estate companies, CityView Commercial LLC and Jacobs Real Estate Advisors in January, 2019. The seller was Vintage Capital Group of Los Angeles.

References 

Shopping malls in the Atlanta metropolitan area
Buildings and structures in Clayton County, Georgia
Tourist attractions in Clayton County, Georgia
Shopping malls established in 1976